Panos may refer to:

People with the given name
Panos is the diminutive of Panagiotis (Panayiotis), a Christian name.

Panos Antsaklis, American engineer
Panos Aravantinos (1886–1930), Greek and German opera scenery and costume designer and decorator
Panos Armenakas (born 1998), American-born Australian footballer 
Panos Bardis (1924–1996), Greek American sociologist 
Panos Constantinou (born 1985), Cypriot footballer
Panos Cosmatos (born 1974), Italian-Canadian film director and screenwriter
Panos Gavalas (1926–1988), Greek singer
Panos Ioannides, Cypriot novelist and playwright
Panos Ioannou (1951–2005), Cypriot biologist and neuroscientist
Panos Ipeirotis (born 1976), Greek professor
Panos Kalaitzakis (born 1999), Greek basketball player
Panos Kallitsis (born 1974), Greek hairstylist and make-up artist
Panos Kammenos (born 1965), Greek politician
Panos Karan (born 1982), British classical pianist, conductor and composer of Greek origin
Panos Kiamos, Greek laiko–pop singer
Panos H. Koutras, Greek filmmaker, writer
Panos Michalopoulos (born 1949), Greek actor 
Panos Mourdoukoutas (born 1955), American economist 
Panos Mouzourakis (born 1979), Greek artist, singer, songwriter and actor
Panos Panay (born 1972), Cypriot entrepreneur, executive and author
Panos Panagiotopoulos (born 1957), Greek politician
Panos Papadopoulos (born 1958), Greek designer and entrepreneur
Panos Paparrigopoulos (1913–1985), Greek poet and writer
Panos Terlemezian (1865–1941), Ottoman Armenian / Soviet Armenian landscape and portrait painter
Panos Theodorou (born 1994), Cypriot footballer
Panos Valavanis (born 1954), Greek classical archaeologist

People with the middle name
Levon Panos Dabağyan (1933–2017), Turkish writer and researcher of Armenian descent

People with the surname

Panos
Greg Panos (born 1956), American writer, futurist, educator, strategic planning consultant, conference / event producer, and technology evangelist 
Joe Panos (born 1971), American football offensive lineman in the NFL
Mickaël Panos (born 1997), French footballer 
Steve Panos (born 1988), Greek-American basketball player
Toss Panos, Greek-American drummer
Vickie Panos (1920–1986), Canadian baseball player
Xenofon Panos (born 1989), Greek footballer

Paños
Javi Paños García-Villamil (born 1991), Spanish footballer
Sandra Paños, Spanish footballer

Others
 Panos (operating system), a computer operating system used by some products of Acorn Computers in the 1980s
 Panos Network, a network of independent non-governmental institutes involved in communication for development
 Panos Pictures, a photo agency based in London
 panos, the plural of pano, short for "panoramic photograph"

See also 
Paños, Chicano prison artwork in the U.S. southwest